VSS may refer to:

Organizations
 Vegetarian Society (Singapore)
 Vernon Secondary School, a high school in Vernon, B.C.
 Veronis Suhler Stevenson, media company
 Voluntary Sports Societies of the Soviet Union
 FC VSS Košice, a Slovak football club

Science and technology
 Variable structure system, a class of discontinuous nonlinear systems
 Vehicle speed sensor, in automobiles
 Verifiable secret sharing, a cryptographic primitive
 Video surveillance system, cameras and other systems combined together to allow remote video monitoring
 Visual SourceSafe, a source control software system produced by Microsoft
 Vital signs stable, in List of medical abbreviations: V
 Volatile suspended solids, a water quality measure
 Voltage symmetrization system in power engineering
 Volume Snapshot Service, or Shadow Copy, in Microsoft Windows 
 Visual Surround Sound / Visual Surround System : when surround sound is created and perceived with less sources than real surround system.
 VSS, a negative IC power-supply pin in FET ICs

Other
 SNV (typeface), also called VSS
 The VSS, an American rock band
 Virgin Space Ship, name prefix for Virgin Galactic's spacecraft
 VSS Vintorez, a Soviet sniper rifle
 VSTOL Support Ship, a proposed 1970s U.S. Navy light carrier

See also